Sajkot is a village of Abbottabad District in Khyber-Pakhtunkhwa province of Pakistan.

References

Populated places in Abbottabad District